Drumtop (1966–1983) was an American Thoroughbred horse racing mare purchased as a yearling for $47,000 who won close to half a million dollars in racing against both females and males.

Racing career
In 1971 Drumtop broke three track records:
 Hialeah Park: 12FT 2:26.4/5, February 27, 1971. 
 Garden State Park: 10FT 1:59.4/5, May 15, 1971. 
 Belmont Park: 12FT 2:25 2/5, June 12, 1971.

Breeding record
When her racing career ended, Drumtop was a broodmare at Rokeby Farm in Upperville, Virginia She produced nine foals that raced of which three were stakes race winners. Drumtop's son Topsider, sired by Northern Dancer, set a new track record for 6½ furlongs at Saratoga Race Course. Topsider became a very good sire of Champions whose offspring won more than $18 million.

Drumtop died in foaling on March 4, 1983, at Rokeby Farm, Virginia.

Pedigree

References
 Drumtop's pedigree and partial racing stats

1966 racehorse births
1983 racehorse deaths
Racehorses bred in Kentucky
Racehorses trained in the United States
Horse racing track record setters
Thoroughbred family 5-h